Lenzie Howell (December 24, 1967 – July 18, 2020) was an American basketball player. He played college basketball with Arkansas for two seasons.

During his brief college stay, Howell received several awards, including the 1989 Southwest Conference tournament Most Outstanding Player award, being named to the 1990 NCAA tournament Midwest Regional Team and winning that region's Most Outstanding Player award.  Earlier that year, on February 21, Howell had arguably his finest regular season performance – 32 points, 10 rebounds, four assists and a steal against Texas A&M.  Considered a great follow-up shooter, and despite typically playing against much bigger defenders, he was Arkansas' leading scorer and second-leading rebounder in the 1990 tournament and was a constant in an otherwise-erratic offense.

After his stint with Arkansas, Howell played a decade in Europe. While playing for Computerij Meppel, he won the Dutch League Most Valuable Player twice.

Lenzie Howell died on July 18, 2020, aged 52.

References

External links
Sports-reference Profile
Cool and tough, Lenzie Howell is Arkansas' secret

1967 births
2020 deaths
African-American basketball players
American expatriate basketball people in France
American expatriate basketball people in the Netherlands
American expatriate basketball people in Turkey
American men's basketball players
Arkansas Razorbacks men's basketball players
Basketball players from Dallas
Cholet Basket players
Dutch Basketball League players
JL Bourg-en-Bresse players
Red Giants (basketball club) players
San Jacinto Central Ravens men's basketball players
Small forwards
Tofaş S.K. players
20th-century African-American sportspeople
21st-century African-American people